Rame is a village in Lääneranna Parish, Pärnu County, in western Estonia.

References

External links 
 Polli Talu Arts Center

Villages in Pärnu County